Toome Lower is a barony in County Antrim, Northern Ireland. It is bordered by four other baronies: Toome Upper to the south; Antrim Lower to the east; Kilconway to the north; and Loughinsholin to the west. Toome Lower also formed part of the medieval territories known as the Route and Clandeboye.

History

List of settlements
Below is a list of settlements in Toome Lower:

Towns
Ahoghill (also part of baronies of Antrim Lower and Toome Upper)
Antrim (also part of barony of Toome Upper)
Cullybackey
Portglenone

Population centres
Gracehill
Killygarn
Lisrodden

List of civil parishes
Below is a list of civil parishes in Toome Lower:
Ahoghill
Craigs
Kirkinriola
Portglenone

References

 
Clandeboye